The Clara Shortridge Foltz Criminal Justice Center (formerly known as the Criminal Courts Building) is the county criminal courthouse in downtown Los Angeles, California, United States. It is located at 210 West Temple Street, between Broadway and Spring Street.

Originally known as the Criminal Courts Building, in 2002 it was renamed the Clara Shortridge Foltz Criminal Justice Center, after Clara S. Foltz, the first female lawyer on the west coast of the United States (and also the first person to propose the creation of a public defender's office).

The building houses the main offices of the Los Angeles County Public Defender.

Notable trials
 Richard Ramirez murder trial
 O. J. Simpson murder trial
 Phil Spector murder trial
 Courtney Love for her assault trial
 Chris Brown for his assault trial
 Helen Golay and Olga Rutterschmidt – 2008 murder trial
 Suge Knight for his trial for a hit and run in 2015
 CeeLo Green for his sexual assault and furnishing ecstasy trial in 2013
 Michael Jace for his murder trial
 Conrad Hilton Jr. for his vehicle theft and violating a restraining order trial
 Lonnie Franklin Jr. aka The Grim Sleeper serial killer trial
 Roman Polanski hearing in related to his sexual abuse scandal 
 BART Police shooting of Oscar Grant murder trial
 Trial of Dr. Conrad Murray for the death of Michael Jackson
 Harvey Weinstein for his sexual assault trials
Trial of Ron Jeremy for sexual assault.
Danny Masterson for his rape trial
Naasón Joaquín García for his sexual assault trial
José Manuel García Guevara for his vehicular assault trials
Eric Ronald Holder Jr for his role in the murder of Nipsey Hussle
Trial of Tory Lanez for shooting at Megan Thee Stallion.
Trial of ASAP Rocky for assault with a deadly weapon.
Trial of Eric Weinberg for sexual assault.
Danny Masterson for his rape charges.

Security measures
High-profile trials are held on the ninth floor of the building, with a secondary screening area in addition to the main screening at the ground floor level.  The eighth and tenth floors are inaccessible from the public elevators and stairwells.

References

Further reading

External links
 Clara Shortridge Foltz Criminal Justice Center
 Offices of the Los Angeles County Public Defender

Courthouses in California
Buildings and structures in Downtown Los Angeles
Civic Center, Los Angeles
Government buildings in Los Angeles
Skyscraper office buildings in Los Angeles
Government buildings completed in 1972
1972 establishments in California
1970s architecture in the United States